The Chennai Football League, sometimes simply known as CFA Senior Division League, and formerly the Madras Football League, is the group of state-level football leagues in the Indian state of Tamil Nadu, including the top-level Senior Division. The League is organised by the Chennai Football Association (CFA), which is affiliated to the Tamil Nadu Football Association (TNFA), the official football governing body of the state.

History 
The Madras Football Association was formed on 26 October 1933, with had the jurisdiction over the undivided province of Madras in British India. It was formed by the members of the Madras United Club. The Madras Football Association league championship was started in 1934 with the inaugural 1934-35 league championship won by the Pachaiyappa football club. The MFA started conducting the First division league from 1936, and the Second division from 1937. In the year of 1972, Madras city clubs formed a separate association and the federation became a part of the Tamil Nadu Football Association.

The league was suspended since the 2018 edition due to the legal disputes between Chennai FA and Tamil Nadu FA, but eventually resumed in 2022.

Competition structure 
There are five divisions in the league under the Chennai Football Association (CFA), with the CFA Senior Division being the top-most league, followed by four lower tiers.

Venue 
The matches are held at Jawaharlal Nehru Stadium.

Champions

See also  
Tamil Nadu Football Association

References 

Football leagues in India
Football in Tamil Nadu
1934 establishments in India
Recurring sporting events established in 1934